The 2023 Oregon Ducks football team will represent the University of Oregon as a member of the Pac-12 Conference during the 2023 NCAA Division I FBS football season. The Ducks expect to be led by Dan Lanning in his second year as Oregon's head coach. They play their home games at Autzen Stadium in Eugene, Oregon.

Schedule

References

Oregon
Oregon Ducks football seasons
Oregon Ducks football